Ruschiella is a genus of flowering plants belonging to the family Aizoaceae.

Its native range is South African Republic.

Species
Species:

Ruschiella argentea 
Ruschiella cedrimontana 
Ruschiella henricii 
Ruschiella lunulata

References

Aizoaceae
Aizoaceae genera